James Marshall Ferris (1828 – March 2, 1893) was an Ontario political figure. He represented Northumberland East in the Legislative Assembly of Ontario as a Liberal member from 1875 to 1886.

He was born in County Fermanagh, Ireland in 1828 and came to Canada West in 1850. In 1857, he married Catherine Fralick. Ferris served as postmaster of Campbellford, Ontario, reeve of Seymour Township and warden of the United Counties of Northumberland and Durham.

Ferris acquired large amounts of property in the Campbellford area and his descendants donated the land which later became Ferris Provincial Park.

External links 
The Canadian parliamentary companion and annual register, 1877, CH Mackintosh

1828 births
1894 deaths
Immigrants to the Province of Canada
Irish emigrants to pre-Confederation Ontario
Ontario Liberal Party MPPs